The New Stations Fund is a programme by the United Kingdom Department for Transport to partially fund new railway stations in conjunction with local authorities or developers.

First round 
The first round was launched in 2013 and funded £20m across five stations:
 Pye Corner opened 2014
 Newcourt  opened 2015
 Lea Bridge  opened 2016
 Ilkeston  opened 2017
 Kenilworth opened 2018

Second round
The second round was launched in 2016 and funded £16m across five stations:
 Warrington West opened 2019
 Horden  opened 2020
 Bow Street opened 2021
 Reading Green Park   
 Portway

Third round
The third round was launched in 2020 and was originally worth £20m but later increased to £32m. Applications closed on 5 June 2020. The winners were announced in November 2020.

 Torquay Gateway
  (under construction)

References

Proposed railway stations in England